Banyasa is a Buddhist temple of the Jogye Order in Chungcheong, South Korea.

History 
Banyasa Temple (Korean: 반야사, Chinese: 般若寺, Pronounced “Ba-nya-sa”) is said to have been established in 720 by Ven. Wonhyo or by Ven. Sangwon, one of Uisang's ten major disciples,  but there are no records to confirm this. Another story tells that National Preceptor Ven. Muyeom  was its founder; this story has a more concrete background as it says: “When Ven. Muyeom resided at Simmyosa Temple in Hwanggan, he dispatched a novice monk named Ven. Sunin to the temple site to cast out the evil dragon living in the pond. Ven. Sunin then established Banyasa Temple after filling in the pond.”

The name “Banyasa” originated from a plaque King Sejo wrote when he attended the inauguration ceremony for the temple's reconstruction. Banyasa Temple was scheduled to open when King Sejo came to see Ven. Sinmi Daesa  at Bokcheonam Hermitage on Mt. Songnisan. King Sejo healed his own skin problems at Banyasa Temple, as he did at Sangwonsa Temple on Mt. Odaesan, thanks to the blessing of the child Manjusri. Afterward, he named the temple Banya (般若; perfection of wisdom), and even wrote its plaque, which is still preserved.

Landscape 
Banyasa Temple's only designated heritage, the Three-Story Stone Pagoda (Treasure No. 1371), was relocated in 1950 from the so-called “Tapbeol,” situated in the Seokcheon Valley north of Banyasa Temple. Thus, the pagoda doesn't provide any reliable information about the temple's history. In addition, the Buddha triad enshrined in the Main Buddha Hall, and the two monk's stupas are designated Regional Cultural Heritage of Yeongdong-gun No. 9, No. 10, No. 11 and No. 12, in that order.

Cultural properties 
Taegeuk-Shaped Terrain and a Tiger

In front of Banyasa Temple, Gusucheon Stream, fed by water from Mt. Baekhwasan, forms an S-shape, which some people see as a “taegeuk.” (symbol of great polarity or yin-yang). In the center of the stream rises a lotus bud-shaped piece of land, on which Banyasa Temple seems to lean. The temple's Munsujeon Hall perches atop a 100-meter-high cliff that overlooks the stream. The Hall reminds visitors they are in the sanctuary of Manjusri Bodhisattva.

Standing with one's back to the Main Buddha Hall, to the rear of the dormitory on one's right, lies a 300-meter long, natural scree-rockslide that forms the perfect outline of a crouching tiger about to leap. To attract more tourists Yeongdong-gun County recently established a photo zone from where visitors can take good pictures with the tiger's outline clearly seen in the background. The tiger's image is, geomantically, in the right place in these remote mountains, part of the Baekdu-daegan, the 460-mile-long mountain range that runs north and south the length of the Korean Peninsula.

Tourism 
It also offers temple stay programs where visitors can experience Buddhist culture.

Gallery

References

External links
 Banyasa official website(in English)

Buddhist temples of the Jogye Order
Buddhist temples in South Korea